Alfred Ernest Grey Trollip (16 July 1895 – 12 March 1972) was a South African politician.

He was a member of the United Party from 1938 until joining the National Party in 1961. He was a member of the Transvaal Provincial Council and an MP for the districts of Brakpan (1938–1953) and Bezuidenhout (1953–1958).

He was the Administrator of Natal Province from 1958 to 1961. He was a member of the Senate of the Union of South Africa from 1961 with the National Party. In Verwoerd's government Trollip served as Minister of Immigration and Employment (1961–1966) and as Minister for Immigration and Indian Affairs (1966–1968) in the government of John Vorster.

References

1895 births
1972 deaths
White South African people
National Party (South Africa) politicians